Arthouse science fiction (or arthouse sci-fi) is a combination of art and science fiction cinema.

List of notable arthouse sci-fi films 
La Jetee (Chris Marker, 1962)
Alphaville (Jean-Luc Goddard, 1965)
Sins of the Fleshapoids (Mike Kuchar, 1965)
Fahrenheit 451 (François Truffaut, 1966)
Seconds (John Frankenheimer, 1966)
2001: A Space Odyssey (Stanley Kubrick, 1968)
A Clockwork Orange (Stanley Kubrick, 1971)
THX-1138 (George Lucas, 1971)
Solaris (Andrei Tarkovsky, 1972)
Fantastic Planet (René Laloux, 1973)
World on a Wire (Rainer Werner Fassbinder, 1973)
A Boy and His Dog (L.Q. Jones, 1975)
The Man Who Fell to Earth (Nicholas Roeg, 1976)
Stalker (Andrei Tarkovsky, 1979)
Altered States (Ken Russell, 1980)
Blade Runner (Ridley Scott, 1982)
Liquid Sky (Slava Tsukerman, 1983)
Videodrome (David Cronenberg, 1983)
Repo Man (Alex Cox, 1984)
Brazil (Terry Gilliam, 1985)
Morning Patrol (Nikos Nikolaidis, 1987)
On the Silver Globe (Andrzej Żuławski, 1988)
Tetsuo: The Iron Man (Shinya Tsukamoto, 1989)
Naked Lunch (David Cronenberg, 1991)
New Rose Hotel (Abel Ferrara, 1998)
eXistenz (David Cronenberg, 1999)
Donnie Darko (Richard Kelly, 2001)
Solaris (Steven Soderbergh, 2002)
Code 46 (Michael Winterbottom, 2003)
2046 (Wong Kar-wai, 2004)
Primer (Shane Carruth, 2004)
Beyond the Black Rainbow (Panos Cosmatos, 2010)
Melancholia (Lars von Trier, 2011)
Cloud Atlas (The Wachowskis and Tom Tykwer, 2012)
Upstream Color (Shane Carruth, 2013)
Under the Skin (Jonathan Glazer, 2013)
Ex Machina (Alex Garland, 2014)
High Life (Claire Denis, 2018)
Sources:

Directors associated with sci-fi art film 
Stanley Kubrick
Andrei Tarkovsky
Shane Carruth
David Cronenberg
Sources:

See also 
Arthouse action film
Art horror
Arthouse animation
Minimalist film
Maximalist film
Slow cinema
Vulgar auteurism
Extreme cinema

References 

Film styles
Film genres
1960s in film
1970s in film
1980s in film
1990s in film
2000s in film
2010s in film
Postmodern art